Maxine Elliott's Theatre was originally a Broadway theatre at 109 West 39th Street in the Midtown Manhattan neighborhood of New York City. Built in 1908, it was designed by architect Benjamin Marshall of the Chicago-based firm Marshall and Fox, who modeled the façade after the neoclassical Petit Trianon in Versailles. In later years, it was known as WOR Mutual Radio Theatre (1941–1944), CBS Radio Playhouse No. 5 (1944–1948), and CBS Television Studio No. 44 or CBS Television Studio Studio 51 (1948–1956). The theater was demolished in 1960 to make way for the Springs Mills Building.

History
The theatre was named for American actress Maxine Elliott, who originally owned a 50 percent interest in it, in partnership with The Shubert Organization. Elliott was one of the few women theater managers of her time. She leased it to the Federal Theatre in 1936; the following year, it was shut down by the government on the eve on the opening of Orson Welles's production of The Cradle Will Rock.

In 1941, the theatre became a radio studio and in 1948 was converted for television production, where the very first episodes of Ed Sullivan's Toast of the Town variety show originated (from 1948 until 1953). In 1956, Elliott's heirs sold her share to the Shuberts, who then sold the property. It was demolished in 1960 and the Springs Mills Building was built on the site, being completed in 1963. The theatre, built in a thriving theatre district, was the last remaining Broadway house below 41st Street.

Maxine Elliott's Theatre seated approximately 935 patrons. Throughout its lifetime, it housed a multitude of plays, including original works by George Bernard Shaw, John Millington Synge, Lady Augusta Gregory, Lord Dunsany, Lillian Hellman and Somerset Maugham. Only nine of its dozens of productions were musicals, including one opera, See America First, by Cole Porter.

Notable productions
 1908: The Chaperon starring Maxine Elliott (opening December 30, 1908)
 1909: The Blue Mouse by Clyde Fitch
 1911: Riders to the Sea; The Playboy of the Western World
 1916: See America First; How He Lied to Her Husband
 1925: Hay Fever; The Master Builder
 1926: The Constant Wife
 1934: The Children's Hour
 1936: Horse Eats Hat
 1937: Doctor Faustus
 1947: Life of Galileo

References

External links

 

1908 establishments in New York City
1941 disestablishments in New York (state)
1941 establishments in New York City
1944 disestablishments in New York (state)
1944 establishments in New York City
1948 disestablishments in New York (state)
1948 establishments in New York City
1956 disestablishments in New York (state)
1960 in New York City
Arts organizations disestablished in the 20th century
Arts organizations established in 1908
Buildings and structures demolished in 1960
CBS Radio
CBS television studios
Demolished buildings and structures in Manhattan
Demolished theatres in New York City
Federal Theatre Project
Former Broadway theatres
Former recording studios
Neoclassical architecture in New York City
Recording studios in Manhattan
Shubert Organization
Theatres completed in 1908